The Empress's Crown is part of the coronation regalia used by the only Shahbanu (Empress) of Iran, Farah Pahlavi.  It is part of the Iranian Crown Jewels and is currently on display at the Central Bank of Iran in Tehran.

Background
Following in the footsteps of policies initiated under the White Revolution that directed the further emancipation of Iranian women, Mohammad Reza Shah determined to make a symbolic gesture by crowning his consort, Empress Farah, during his own elaborate coronation ceremony in October 1967.  Until that date, the wives of Persian monarchs had never been crowned since the Muslim conquest of Iran, so it was therefore necessary to design a new crown for the occasion. That honor was bestowed upon the French jewelers, Van Cleef & Arpels. 

In accordance with tradition, the gems used were selected from loose stones already in the Imperial treasury.  Since it was against the law for items from the Imperial Treasury to leave Iran, Van Cleef & Arpels were obliged to send a team of jewelers to Tehran in order to construct the crown, a process which occupied them for six months.

Composition
The frame of the crown is made of white gold and is lined with a cap of green velvet.  The crown contains 36 emeralds, 105 pearls, 34 rubies, two spinels, and 1,469 diamonds.  The largest emerald is located in the center of the sunburst on the front of the crown, and weighs approximately 92 cts. The two large spinels are approximately 83 cts., and the largest pearl is approximately 22 mm long. 

In her memoir, the former Empress extolls the beauty of the crown but notes that it was also quite heavy, weighing nearly two kilograms.

References

Individual crowns
Iranian National Jewels
Empress
National symbols of Iran
Pahlavi dynasty